Mid-Hudson Islamic Association (Masjid Al-Noor Arabic: مسجد النور) is an Islamic Association located at Masjid Al-Noor in Wappingers Falls, NY, United States. The group was founded in the 1980s in response to a large addition of Muslim families in the Hudson River Valley. The group originally met in their own homes for prayers and social/religious events. In 1990, they opened a mosque that provided prayer space, an educational Sunday school, and community services. The building has three stories - the men's prayer hall is located on the ground floor, and the women's prayer balcony is on the second floor overlooking the main prayer hall. The basement of the mosque serves as a community hall. A small minaret was added to the north side of the building sometime after the original construction.

See also
  List of mosques in the Americas
  Lists of mosques 
  List of mosques in the United States

External links

Al-Noor Islamic School

Mosques in New York (state)